Pink Lady Lemonade ~ You're From Outer Space is an album by Acid Mothers Temple & The Cosmic Inferno, released in 2008 by Riot Season. It is their only album with Afrirampo's Pikachu on vocals and drums.

Track listing

Personnel
 Tabata Mitsuru - Bass, Voice, Acoustic Guitar, Maratab
 Shimura Koji - Drums, Percussion, Latino Cool
 Pikachu - Drums, Voice, Cosmic Shaman
 Higashi Hiroshi - Synthesizer, Dancin' King
 Kawabata Makoto - Guitar, Voice, Speed Guru
 Audrey Ginestet - Voice, Cosmos

Technical personnel
 Kawabata Makoto - Production and Engineering
 Pikachu - Artwork

References

Acid Mothers Temple albums
2008 albums